St Buryan was an electoral division of Cornwall in the United Kingdom which returned one member to sit on Cornwall Council between 2009 and 2021. It was abolished at the 2021 local elections, being succeeded by Land's End, Ludgvan, Madron, Gulval and Heamoor, and Mousehole, Newlyn and St Buryan.

Councillors

Extent
St Buryan represented the villages of Madron, Sancreed, Drift, Lamorna, St Buryan, Penberth, Treen, Porthgwarra, Porthcurno, Sennen and Sennen Cove, and the hamlets of Great Bosullow, Little Bosullow, Lower Bodinnar, Newbridge, Grumbla, Tregavarah, Brane, Crows-an-Wra, Kerris, Castallack, Tregadgwith, Trevorgans, Bottoms, St Levan, Trethewey, Trebehor, Trevescan, Mayon, Carn Towan and Escalls.

The division was nominally abolished during boundary changes at the 2013 election. From 2009 to 2013, the division covered 9,518 hectares in total; after the boundary changes in 2013, it covered 8,998 hectares.

Election results

2017 election

2013 election

2009 election

References

Penwith
Electoral divisions of Cornwall Council